Hrinchenko is a surname. Notable people with the surname include:

Andriy Hrinchenko (born 1986), Ukrainian footballer
Borys Hrinchenko (1863–1910), Ukrainian writer, activist, historian, publicist and ethnographer
Maria Hrinchenko (1863–1928), Ukrainian folklorist
Mykola Hrinchenko (born 1986), Ukrainian footballer
Vladyslav Hrinchenko (born 1989), Ukrainian footballer